Hari Nef (born October 21, 1992) is an American actress, model, and writer. Nef's breakthrough role was Gittel in the Amazon original series Transparent, for which she was nominated for a SAG award in 2016. She made her runway debut at New York Fashion Week Spring 2015, walking for both Hood By Air and Eckhaus Latta, and subsequently became the first openly transgender woman signed to IMG Models. She became the first openly transgender woman to appear on the cover of a major British magazine. Nef has written on a breadth of topics from fine art and film to sex, gender, and transgender identity. She lives and works in New York City.

Early life and education
Hari Nef was born in Philadelphia into a Jewish family. Her parents are David Neff, an advertising executive, and Robin Clebnik. Her parents divorced when she was two and she was raised by her mother in Newton, Massachusetts.

Nef graduated from Columbia University in May 2015 with a degree in theater.

Career

Acting 
Nef starred as Tante Gittel in the 2015 Emmy-winning television series Transparent. Gittel's character is a Pfefferman family ancestor that lived her life as a cross-dresser in Berlin, Germany during the Weimar Republic and eventually was murdered during the Holocaust. Creator Joey Soloway wrote the part for Nef after the two connected on social media and  attended a PFLAG party together. She  received a 2016 SAG Award nomination for the role.

In 2018, Nef starred as a major lead in Sam Levinson's comedy thriller Assassination Nation. The film stars Nef alongside Odessa Young, Suki Waterhouse, and Abra. In the same year, she had a recurring role as Blythe on the Lifetime psychological thriller television series You. In 2018, Nef made her New York theater debut as a lead in Jeremy O. Harris' Daddy.

In 2022, Nef starred in the comedy film 1Up, alongside Ruby Rose, Paris Berelc, Taylor Zakhar Perez, and Nicholas Coombe. In August, it was announced that Nef would portray Candy Darling in a biopic from Transparent writer Stephanie Kornick.

Later that year, Nef returned to the stage and starred in Denis Johnson’s play, Des Moines, at the Polonsky Shakespeare Center in Brooklyn.

Nef is set to star in the upcoming HBO drama series The Idol as well as Greta Gerwig's upcoming film, Barbie. She is set to perform in Thomas Bradshaw's debut of his adaptation of Chekhov's classic play, The Seagull, alongside Parker Posey,  Patrick Foley, and Nat Wolff.

Writing 
Nef has written profiles on various artists and cultural figures including director John Waters, singer/actress Cristina Ortiz Rodriguez, Javier Calvo and Javier Ambrossi's Spanish biographical series Veneno, and painter Nash Glynn. Nef wrote a regular sex advice and experience column for Sarah Nicole Prickett's Adult magazine. Her writing has appeared in Artforum, Dazed, Vice, Original Plumbing, L'Officiel, and BlackBook.

Modeling 
In 2014, Nef was on the cover of Frische Magazine. That same year, she was placed at number 68 on Dazeds 100 list. Nef also moved to the top of the Dazed Readers 100, ranking number one overall, and appeared in the i-D Pre-Fall Issue twice.

In 2015, she again walked shows during New York Fashion Week, including Adam Selman, VFiles, Vejas, Degen, and Eckhaus Latta once more. In May of the same year, Nef was signed to IMG Models, making her the first openly transgender model signed to that agency. In the summer of 2015, Nef was cast in the second season of Amazon Prime's Transparent, which debuted in December 2015. She also starred in The Drums' music video "There Is Nothing Left" in August. The Forward newspaper included her in the Forward 50, a list of the year's 50 most influential Jewish-Americans.

Elle printed special collectors' covers for their September 2016 issue, and one of them featured Nef, which was the first time an openly transgender woman had been on the cover of a major commercial British magazine.

In January 2017, Nef starred in a television commercial for the L'Oréal Paris True Match line alongside Blake Lively, Lara Stone, and Xiao Wen Ju. The campaign was premiered at the 2017 Golden Globe Awards telecast.

Nef walked nine runways at Spring/Summer 2023’s Fashion Month in New York.

Filmography

Film

Television

Theater

References

Further reading
  Interview with Nef

External links

 Hari Nef  at IMG Models
 

1992 births
Actors from Newton, Massachusetts
Actresses from Philadelphia
IMG Models models
Jewish American actresses
Jewish American writers
Jewish female models
Jewish women writers
LGBT Jews
LGBT people from California
LGBT people from Massachusetts
LGBT people from Pennsylvania
Living people
Transgender actresses
Transgender female models
Transgender writers
Transgender Jews
Writers from Newton, Massachusetts
Writers from Philadelphia
Columbia College (New York) alumni
21st-century American Jews
American LGBT actors
21st-century American women